Claudio Panatta and Pavel Složil were the defending champions, but competed this year with different partners.

Panatta teamed up with Andreas Maurer and lost in the first round to Nelson Aerts and Mark Woodforde.

Složil teamed up with Jakob Hlasek and successfully defended his title, by defeating Gary Donnelly and Colin Dowdeswell 6–3, 3–6, 11–9 in the final.

Seeds

Draw

Draw

References

External links
 Official results archive (ATP)
 Official results archive (ITF)

1986 Grand Prix (tennis)
1986 Doubles